Hoomale is a 1998 Indian Kannada language film directed by Nagathihalli Chandrashekhar and written by Ramesh Aravind. The film, besides Ramesh, stars Suman Nagarkar, H. G. Dattatreya, Sorat Ashwath and B. V. Radha in prominent roles. Produced by K. S. Usha Rao, the film was highly appraised by critics upon release and went on to win many awards and accolades including the much coveted National Film Award for Best Feature Film in Kannada. Actor Ramesh won in the Best Actor category at the Karnataka State Film Awards and Filmfare Awards South.

The movie is shot in Assam and Bengaluru.

Plot
It is a love story in the backdrop of terrorism set in Assam.

Soundtrack
The music of the movie is composed by Ilayaraja.
Audio On Manoranjan Audio

Awards

References

1998 films
1990s Kannada-language films
Films about terrorism in India
Films set in Assam
Films scored by Ilaiyaraaja
Non-Assamese-language films with Assamese connection
Best Kannada Feature Film National Film Award winners
Films directed by Nagathihalli Chandrashekhar